Bruce G. Blowers (born May 15, 1987), is a classically trained, American contemporary Christian music singer-songwriter from St. Petersburg, Florida. Blowers is signed with Caravan Media, an independent record label based out of Central Florida. He released his first full-length album Through Glass in 2009.

Biography
Blowers taught himself to read and play music at age nine using a keyboard he found under his parents' bed.  He wrote his first song "God Made Everything" at the age of ten and it was later performed by his church choir.  Music came so naturally to him that he was able to get a perfect sound out of an oboe on his first attempt.  Blowers has been a principal or second chair oboist for the Keswick Christian School Band, the Pinellas Youth Symphony, the Tampa Bay Youth Orchestra, the Tampa Bay Symphony Orchestra, the orchestra at Seminole High School, the University of South Florida, and the St. Petersburg College Orchestra and Band.  Blowers' original orchestral compositions have been played by members of the Tampa Bay Symphony, and Florida Orchestra. The first symphony Blowers ever wrote won second place at the 34th Annual Composer's Guild Competition. Blowers has also performed in Carnegie Hall with the National Festival Orchestra. and was a member of the "Musical Ambassadors Tour of Russia" in which the St. Petersburg College Madrigalians performed for audiences in Moscow, Saint Petersburg, and Orenburg.  Because of his deep understanding of musical composition and ability to master many instruments so young, Blowers was often referred to as a musical child prodigy.

Through Glass

Blowers recorded his first studio album Through Glass in late 2009 at Oh Good! Studios in DeLand, Florida. The album contains ten piano-driven tracks, most of which were inspired by Blowers' strong Christian faith. In addition to writing the lyrics and music for every track, Blowers plays piano and sings lead vocals on every song. The album has been well received by both Critics, fans of Blowers' previous symphony compositions, and the iTunes, MySpace, and Facebook communities.  The St. Petersburg Times described the album as a "slickly produced collection of 10 catchy pop songs, with Blowers singing and playing piano with a soft-rock group." John Fleming, Performing Arts Critic for the Times went on to describe Blowers as "a soulful singer-songwriter of Christian pop music." Singer-songwriter Matt Hires, who is a second cousin of Blowers, made an appearance at Blowers' album première concert in Seminole, Florida, playing lead guitar on "Distance", Through Glass's second track.

Discography

Studio albums
Through Glass - 2009

Through GlassTrack listing"Through Glass"
"Distance"
"Reverie"
"You"
"We Just Might Make It"
"Love Letter"
"Every Leaf"
"Singing at Night"
"Wings of the Wind"
"Atonement"

Acting credits
In addition to his music career, Blowers has appeared in commercials for Disney and played the role of "Lance" in the television drama series, Walk on Water''. Blowers has also lent his acting, dancing, and vocal talent to several Musical and Opera performances at the Palladium Theater in St. Petersburg, Florida.

Tours
Blowers visits churches and youth events throughout Central Florida playing his music. In concert, his sister, Brianne Grace Blowers, often accompanies him on flute for the track "You." Brianne also contributed backup vocals on two of the album's tracks. Blowers has also been known to play covers of Michael Bublé's song "Home" live. At the beginning of 2010, Blowers announced a summer tour of Greece, and surprised audience members at Bethel Lutheran Church, in Clearwater, Florida when he played a new song he had written on the guitar entitled "Your Road to Feel". Blowers has since stated that while he is not giving up the piano, teaching himself to play the guitar has been a furthering of his musical exploration and he plans to use it for certain tracks in the future.

References

External links
 
 

1987 births
American performers of Christian music
American rock singers
American male singer-songwriters
American rock songwriters
Living people
Musicians from St. Petersburg, Florida
Keswick Christian School alumni
University of South Florida alumni
Writers from St. Petersburg, Florida
Seminole High School (Pinellas County, Florida) alumni
Place of birth missing (living people)
Singer-songwriters from Florida
21st-century American male singers
21st-century American singers